John Spencer Fryer (1877–1933) was an English footballer who played for Derby County and Fulham in the Football League. He played in each of Derby's first three FA Cup Final appearances. He was reputedly one of the heaviest players to have taken to a football pitch.

References

1877 births
1933 deaths
English footballers
Association football goalkeepers
Clay Cross Town F.C. (1874) players
Derby County F.C. players
Fulham F.C. players
English Football League players
People from Cromford
Footballers from Derbyshire
FA Cup Final players